Sandsend railway station was a railway station on the Whitby, Redcar and Middlesbrough Union Railway. It was opened on 3 December 1883, and served the villages of Sandsend and Lythe. It closed on 5 May 1958. The station building is now a private residence. It was the only station between Whitby and Loftus not to possess a passing loop.

History
It had a single platform, a brick station building which included the stationmaster's house, and a single siding serving coal drops (now converted into garages) behind the station. Camping coaches were stationed on the siding in later years. 

A passing loop was never added because of the extensive works it would have required. This made Sandsend, the only one of the seven stations between, and including Whitby and Loftus, which did not have a passing loop. This yard also had space for camping coaches, with three being normally located there.

Sandsend Viaduct was sited immediately south of the station. A pillbox which was built in the Second World War to defend the viaduct is still in place.

In October 2020 the Mulgrave Estate, owners of the land that the station covered, successfully applied to site railway coaches on the platform as holiday accommodation. The two railway vehicles will sit on the platform on a short section of track. One will be a former passenger-carrying coach whilst the second will be a converted freight wagon.

Services
Between 1910 and 1922, services in the summer consisted of six daily trains each way. This had risen by 1938 to 14 each way, though in winter, the number of services could be as low as three.

In popular culture 
In the 1947 British comedy drama Holiday Camp, the opening shots of a train arriving at a seaside cliff-top station and passengers boarding buses outside the station were filmed at Sandsend.

References

Sources

Further reading

External links

 Sandsend station on navigable 1955 O. S. map

Disused railway stations in the Borough of Scarborough
Former North Eastern Railway (UK) stations
Railway stations in Great Britain opened in 1883
Railway stations in Great Britain closed in 1958